Studeničani Municipality is a municipality in central North Macedonia. Studeničani is the name of the village where the municipal seat is found. It is located in the Skopje Statistical Region.

Geography 
The municipality borders the City of Skopje to the north, Sopište Municipality to the northwest and west, Čaška Municipality to the south, Zelenikovo Municipality to the east and Petrovec Municipality to the northeast.

Demographics 
According to the 2021 Macedonians census, this municipality has 21,970 inhabitants. Ethnic groups in the municipality:

Inhabited places

There are 15 inhabited places in this municipality.

References

External links 
 

 
Skopje Statistical Region
Municipalities of North Macedonia